Karel van der Pluym (1625, Leiden – 1672, Leiden), was a Dutch Golden Age painter.

Biography
According to the RKD he was a pupil of Rembrandt. According to the Frick gallery, their "old woman with a book" was purchased by Henry Clay Frick in 1916 as a Rembrandt.

References

Karel van der Pluym on Artnet
Karel van der Pluym at PubHist

1625 births
1672 deaths
Dutch Golden Age painters
Dutch male painters
Artists from Leiden
Pupils of Rembrandt